João Batista Eugênio da Silva (born August 22, 1963 in João Pessoa, Paraíba) is a Brazilian retired sprinter who competed in 200 metres and 400 metres.

Career

João Silva reached at 200 m final, finished 4th (20.30 s) at the 1984 Summer Olympics, in Los Angeles, United States.

He won the medal bronze at 200 m (21.19 s) at the 1985 IAAF World Indoor Games in Paris, France.

References

1963 births
Athletes (track and field) at the 1984 Summer Olympics
Brazilian male sprinters
Olympic athletes of Brazil
Living people
Athletes (track and field) at the 1983 Pan American Games
Pan American Games bronze medalists for Brazil
Pan American Games medalists in athletics (track and field)
World Athletics Indoor Championships medalists
Medalists at the 1983 Pan American Games
Sportspeople from Paraíba
20th-century Brazilian people